Julien-Joseph is a French given name. Notable people with the name include:

 Julien Joseph Audette (1914–1989), pioneering Canadian aviator
 Julien-Joseph Ducorron (1770–1848), Belgian landscape painter
 Julien Joseph Vesque (1848–1895), French naturalist
 Julien-Joseph Virey (1775–1846), French naturalist and anthropologist

See also 
 Julien (given name)
 Joseph (given name)

French masculine given names
Compound given names